The Ben Lomond Mountain AVA is an American Viticultural Area in Santa Cruz County, California, located on the western edge of the Santa Cruz Mountains. Jim Beauregard established the AVA in 1983 and Beauregard Vineyards continues to be only winery that currently produces wine bearing the Ben Lomond Mountain AVA designation. Vineyards were first planted on the mountain in the 1860s sitting at a premium spot for grape growing.

References 

American Viticultural Areas of the San Francisco Bay Area
Geography of Santa Cruz County, California
American Viticultural Areas
American Viticultural Areas of California
Wineries in Santa Cruz Mountains
1987 establishments in California